Siosifa Talakai (born 18 April 1997) is a Tonga international rugby league footballer who plays as a  or  for the Cronulla-Sutherland Sharks in the NRL.

He previously played for the South Sydney Rabbitohs in the National Rugby League.

Background
Talakai was born in Sydney, New South Wales, Australia. He is of Tongan,and Niuean descent.

He played his junior rugby league for the Mascot Jets, before being signed by the South Sydney Rabbitohs.

Playing career

Early career
In 2015 and 2016, Talakai played for the South Sydney Rabbitohs' NYC team.

2016
On 7 May, Talakai played for the Junior Kiwis against the Junior Kangaroos. In round 13 of the 2016 NRL season, he made his NRL debut for South Sydney against the Gold Coast Titans, scoring a try with his first touch. He was contracted to South Sydney until the end of 2016.

2017
Talakai was hampered by a knee injury during the 2017 season limiting him to only 8 appearances for the entire season.

2018
Talakai departed Souths mid season in 2018 to sign a contract to join the Penrith Panthers.  Talakai was unable to break into the first grade team and spent the remainder of the year playing for Penrith's Intrust Super Premiership NSW side.

2019
In 2019, Talakai joined Newtown after being released by Penrith at the end of 2018.
Talakai played for Newtown in their Canterbury Cup NSW grand final victory over the Wentworthville Magpies at Bankwest Stadium.

2020
In round 4 of the 2020 NRL season, Talakai made his debut for Cronulla-Sutherland as they won their first game of the year defeating North Queensland 26-16 at Queensland Country Bank Stadium.

2021
In round 7 of the 2021 NRL season, Talakai was sin binned for an illegal shoulder charge in Cronulla's 18-12 loss against Canterbury.
On 27 April, Talakai was suspended for four matches in relation to the illegal shoulder charge.
Talakai played 15 games for Cronulla in the 2021 NRL season which saw the club narrowly miss the finals by finishing 9th on the table.

2022
The 2022 season for Talakai was his best yet scoring 7 tries and assisting 9 others in the 21 games he played in that season. Due to injuries in the Cronulla backline, Talakai moved from his typical second row position into the centres. In round 7 of the 2022 NRL season, Talakai scored two tries and assisted 3 others for Cronulla in a man of the match performance which saw the club defeat rivals Manly 34-22 in the Battle of the Beaches game.

On 11 June, an arrest warrant was issued for Talakai after he failed to appear in court for driving with an expired licence.  It was alleged that Talakai had been stopped by police on Captain Cook Drive at Caringbah where it was discovered he had an expired drivers licence.  The media approached the Cronulla club for comment but they stated they were unaware of the incident.  The arrest warrant for Talakai was later revoked and the court date was moved for the 23 June.

On 19 June, Talakai was selected by New South Wales for game two of the 2022 State of Origin series.
Talakai played off the bench for New South Wales in their 44-12 victory over Queensland.

In Game 3 of the series, Talakai made 2 errors which proved to be costly in New South Wales 22-12 defeat to Queensland at Lang Park.

Talakai played 21 games for Cronulla in the 2022 NRL season as they surprised many by finishing second on the table.  Talakai played in Cronulla's qualifying final loss to North Queensland in which he scored a try.  Talakai did not feature in Cronulla's 38-12 elimination final loss to South Sydney which ended their season.

Statistics

NRL
 Statistics are correct as of the end of the 2022 season

State of Origin

International

References

External links

Cronulla Sharks profile
South Sydney Rabbitohs profile
Rabbitohs profile

1997 births
Living people
Australian people of New Zealand descent
Australian people of Niuean descent
Australian sportspeople of Tongan descent
Australian rugby league players
Cronulla-Sutherland Sharks players
Junior Kiwis players
New South Wales Rugby League State of Origin players
Newtown Jets NSW Cup players
North Sydney Bears NSW Cup players
Rugby league centres
Rugby league players from Sydney
Rugby league second-rows
South Sydney Rabbitohs players
Tonga national rugby league team players